Tezerj (also known as Tadarj, Tadraj, Tazarch, Tazerch Deh-e Now, and Tazerch Deh Now) is a village in Balvard Rural District, in the Central District of Sirjan County, Kerman Province, Iran. At the 2006 census, its population was 48, in 11 families.

References 

Populated places in Sirjan County